Driekoppies Dam is a gravity/earth-fill type dam on the Komati River, near Malelane, Mpumalanga, South Africa. It was established in 1998 and its primary purpose is for irrigation.

See also
List of reservoirs and dams in South Africa
List of rivers of South Africa

References 

 List of South African Dams from the Department of Water Affairs and Forestry (South Africa)

Dams in South Africa
Dams completed in 1998